Duncan Nathaniel Ingraham (6 December 1802 – 16 October 1891) was an officer in the United States Navy who later served in the Confederate States Navy.

U.S. Navy service
A native of Charleston, South Carolina, Ingraham was appointed Midshipman in the United States Navy on 18 June 1812 at the age of 10.  After years of distinguished service, he was commissioned Captain 14 September 1855. While in command of the sloop-of-war St. Louis in the Mediterranean, in July 1853, he interfered with the detention by the Austrian consul at Smyrna (Izmir, Turkey) of Martin Koszta, a Hungarian who had declared in New York his intention of becoming an American citizen, and, who had been seized and confined in the Austrian ship Hussar. For his conduct in this matter he was voted thanks and a Gold Medal by Congress.

Captain Ingraham served as Chief of the Bureau of Ordnance and Hydrographer of the Navy from 1856 until 1860.

Confederate Navy service
He resigned from the U.S. Navy 4 February 1861 to enter the Confederate States Navy with the rank of captain. He served as Chief of the Ordnance Bureau from 1861 to 1863, and as Commandant of the Charleston naval station from 1862 to 1865.

Ingraham died at Charleston 16 October 1891.

Legacy
Four ships of the US Navy have been named USS Ingraham in his honor.

References

External links

history.navy.mil: Duncan Ingraham

1802 births
1891 deaths
Confederate States Navy captains
United States Navy officers
Military personnel from Charleston, South Carolina
Congressional Gold Medal recipients